Ambrose Askin (24 February 1909 – January 1979) was an English professional rugby league footballer who played in the 1930s. Ambrose Askin's funeral took place at St Botolph's Church, Knottingley.

Playing career

County League appearances
Ambrose Askin played in Castleford's victory in the Yorkshire County League during the 1932–33 season.

Club career
Ambrose Askin made his debut for Castleford at Hull F.C. on 26 March 1932, a match in which his brother Tom was unable to play due to injury. He had joined the club after leaving the army. In November 1936, when aged 25, he was put on the transfer list at a price of £200; at that time he weighed 13.5 stone and stood 5 feet 11.5 inches tall.

Askin was transferred from Keighley to Featherstone Rovers in January 1938, with Cyril Hammond moving in the opposite direction. He made his debut for Featherstone on 15 January, but the outbreak of World War II on 1 September 1939 meant his opportunities to play for Featherstone Rovers were curtailed, and injuries sustained in the Battle of Dunkirk ended his rugby career.

Outside of rugby league
After the end of World War II, Ambrose Askin became a fish fryer in Knottingley, living at 4 Cardwell Terrace, Foundry Lane, Knottingley.

References

External links
Search for "Askin" at rugbyleagueproject.org
Ambrose Askin Memory Box Search at archive.castigersheritage.com

1909 births
1979 deaths
British Army personnel of World War II 
Castleford Tigers players
English rugby league players
Featherstone Rovers players
Keighley Cougars players
Rugby league fullbacks
Rugby league players from Pontefract
Rugby league wingers